Jason Hughes may refer to:
 Jason Hughes (actor) (born 1971), Welsh actor
 Jason Hughes (auto racing) (born 1969), owner-driver of the Kartworld Racing auto racing team
 Jason Hughes (politician), member of the Louisiana House of Representatives
 Jason Hughes (sociologist), Professor of Sociology at the University of Leicester, UK

See also
Jason Jones-Hughes (born 1976), rugby player
Hughes (surname)